André Florschütz (born 6 August 1976 in Sonneberg) is a German luger who competed from 1993 to 2010. Together with Torsten Wustlich, he won the silver medal in the men's doubles event at the 2006 Winter Olympics in Turin.

Florschütz also won nine medals at the FIL World Luge Championships with six golds (Men's doubles: 2001, 2005, 2008; Mixed team: 2005, 2008, 2009) and three silvers (Men's doubles: 2004, 2009; Mixed team: 1999).

His best overall finish at the FIL European Luge Championships was fifth in the men's doubles event twice (2004, 2008).

Florschütz's best overall finish in the men's doubles Luge World Cup was second three times (2000-1, 2003-4, 2004-5). His younger brother Thomas competes for Germany in bobsleigh.

References
 After Leitner/Resch and Grimette/Martin. at the Fédération Internationale de Luge de Course (30 March 2010 article accessed 30 March 2010.)

External links
 

1976 births
Living people
People from Sonneberg
People from Bezirk Suhl
German male lugers
Sportspeople from Thuringia
Olympic lugers of Germany
Lugers at the 2006 Winter Olympics
Lugers at the 2010 Winter Olympics
Olympic silver medalists for Germany
Olympic medalists in luge
Medalists at the 2006 Winter Olympics